The Afroinsectiphilia (African insectivores) is a clade that has been proposed based on the results of recent molecular phylogenetic studies. Many of the taxa within it were once regarded as part of the order Insectivora, but Insectivora is now considered to be polyphyletic and obsolete. This proposed classification is based on molecular studies only, and there is no morphological evidence for it.

The golden moles, otter shrews and tenrecs are part of this clade. Some also regard the elephant shrews and aardvarks as part of it, although these two orders were traditionally seen as primitive ungulates. The sister group of the Afroinsectiphilia is the Paenungulata, which were also traditionally regarded as ungulates.

If the clade of Afrotheria is genuine, then the Afroinsectiphilia are the closest relatives of the Pseudoungulata (here regarded as part of Afroinsectiphilia) and the Paenungulata. In a classification governed by morphological data, both the Pseudoungulata and Paenungulata are seen as true ungulates, thus not related to Afroinsectiphilia. However, DNA research is thought to provide a more fundamental classification.

Additionally, there might be some dental synapomorphies uniting afroinsectiphilians: p4 talonid and trigonid of similar breadth, 
a prominent p4 hypoconid, presence of a P4 metacone and absence of parastyles on M1–2. Additional features uniting ptolemaiidans and tubulidentates specifically include hypsodont molars that wear down to a flat surface; a long and shallow mandible with an elongated symphyseal region; and trigonids and talonids that are separated by lateral constrictions.

Taxonomy
 INFRACLASS EUTHERIA: placental mammals
 Superorder Afrotheria
Clade Afroinsectiphilia
 Order Afrosoricida
 Suborder Tenrecomorpha
 Family Potamogalidae: otter shrews; 3 species in 2 genera
 Family Tenrecidae: tenrecs; 31 extant species in 8 genera
 †Incertae familiae: Genus Plesiorycteropus; extinct aardvark-like tenrec relatives from the Late Pleistocene/Holocene of Madagascar
 Suborder Chrysochloridea
 Family Chrysochloridae: golden moles; about 21 species in 9 genera
 Order Macroscelidea: elephant shrews (according to some recent data part of Afroinsectiphilia)
 Order Tubulidentata: aardvark (according to some recent data part of Afroinsectiphilia)
 †Order Ptolemaiida: extinct carnivorous mammals, probably closely related to aardvarks.
Clade Paenungulata

Phylogeny

References

 

Phylogenetics